Anthony Flamini (born October 3, 1978) is an American freelance comic book writer.  He served as Head Writer and Coordinator for the "Civil War: Battle Damage Report" and "Civil War Files." He wrote three volumes of short stories and profiles as part of the Marvel Comics adaptation of Stephen King's Dark Tower series which have since been collected in the Dark Tower Omnibus.  He also contributed to the development of the world of Planet Hulk and the histories/biographical information of several members of Big Hero 6.

Comics work

Writer
All-New Iron Manual #1 (with art by Greg Land, Eliot R. Brown & Jeffrey Huet, 2008, collected in Iron Manual TPB Vol 1, 2008)
All-New Official Handbook of the Marvel Universe A to Z #1-12
All-New Official Handbook of the Marvel Universe A to Z: Update #1-3
Annihilation: The Nova Corps Files (with art by Andrea Di Vito & Laura Villari, 2006, collected in Annihilation: Book Three HC, 2007)
Big Hero 6, vol. 2
Civil War Files (with art by Steve McNiven, Dexter Vines & Morry Hollowell, 2006, collected in Civil War Companion TPB, 2007)
Civil War: Battle Damage Report (with co-author Ronald Byrd and art by Ed McGuinness & Scott Kolins, 2007, collected in Civil War Companion TPB, 2007)
Daredevil Saga #1
The Dark Tower: Gunslinger's Guidebook (with art by Jae Lee & Richard Isanove, 2007, collected in Dark Tower Omnibus, 2011)
The Dark Tower: End-World Almanac (with art by David Yardin, Jae Lee & Richard Isanove, 2008, collected in Dark Tower Omnibus, 2011)
The Dark Tower: Guide to Gilead (with art by David Yardin, Jae Lee & Richard Isanove, 2009, collected in Dark Tower Omnibus, 2011)
Hulk Chronicles: WWH #1
Marvel Atlas #1-2 (with co-authors Michael Hoskin, Eric J. Moreels & Stuart Vandal, and art by Staz Johnson & Eliot R. Brown, 2007, tpb, 2008)
Marvel Legacy: The 1960s Handbook (with art by Sal Buscema & Tom Smith, 2006, collected in Marvel Legacy: The 1960s-1990s Handbook TPB, 2007)
Marvel Legacy: The 1970s Handbook (with art by Sal Buscema & Tom Smith, 2006, collected in Marvel Legacy: The 1960s-1990s Handbook TPB, 2007)
Marvel Legacy: The 1980s Handbook (with art by Sal Buscema & Tom Smith, 2006, collected in Marvel Legacy: The 1960s-1990s Handbook TPB, 2007)
Marvel Legacy: The 1990s Handbook (with art by Ron Lim & Tom Smith, 2006, collected in Marvel Legacy: The 1960s-1990s Handbook TPB, 2007)
Marvel Westerns: Outlaw Files
The Mighty Avengers: Most Wanted Files
The New Avengers: Most Wanted Files
The Official Handbook of the Marvel Universe: Alternate Universes 2005
The Official Handbook of the Marvel Universe: Avengers 2005
The Official Handbook of the Marvel Universe: Fantastic Four 2005
The Official Handbook of the Marvel Universe: Horror 2005
The Official Handbook of the Marvel Universe: Marvel Knights 2005
The Official Handbook of the Marvel Universe: Teams 2005
The Official Handbook of the Marvel Universe: Women of Marvel 2005
Planet Hulk: Gladiator Guidebook (with co-author Greg Pak, and art by Carlo Pagulayan, Aaron Lopresti, José Ladrönn, Ryan Sook, Alex Maleev, Lucio Parrillo, James Raiz & Jim Calafiore, 2006, collected in Incredible Hulk: Planet Hulk HC, 2008,  and Hulk: Planet Hulk Omnibus, 2017)
Skaar: Son of Hulk Presents - Savage World of Sakaar #1
Spider-Man: Back in Black Handbook
Thor & Hercules: Encyclopaedia Mythologica #1 (with co-authors Greg Pak, Fred Van Lente and Paul Cornell, 2009)

Footnotes

External links
Anthony Flamini on Marvel.com
Anthony Flamini at the Comic Book Database
Anthony Flamini at Comicvine, the Comic Book Encyclopedia
 Anthony Flamini on Myspace

1978 births
Living people
People from Voorhees Township, New Jersey
American comics writers
American writers of Italian descent